Rancho Corte Madera del Presidio was a   Mexican land grant in present day Marin County, California given in 1834  by Governor José Figueroa to John (Juan) Reed.  Corte Madera del Presidio means the "lumber mill of the Presidio".  The grant encompassed what is now southern Corte Madera,   Mill Valley, the Tiburon Peninsula, and Strawberry Point. It reached from Point Tiburon to Larkspur Creek, then known as Arroyo Holon.

History
John Thomas Reed (1805 - 1843), a native of Dublin, Ireland, came to San Francisco in 1826 and the one square league grant was made to him in 1834.  In 1836, John Reed married Hilaria Sánchez (1817 -1872) who was the sister of alcaldes Francisco Sanchez and José de la Cruz Sánchez.   Reed was the founder of the sawmill that gave Mill Valley its name.  Reed served as administrator of the Mission San Rafael Arcángel from 1836 to 1837.  He then set out to build a larger house, in what is now Mill Valley, but died in 1843, at the age of 38, before his house was finished.  After Reed's death, Hilaria Sanchez married Bernardino Garcia in 1843. 

With the cession of California to the United States following the Mexican-American War, the 1848 Treaty of Guadalupe Hidalgo provided that the land grants would be honored. As required by the California Land Act of 1851, a claim for Rancho Corte Madera del Presidio was filed with the Public Land Commission in 1852. The Land Commission confirmed only  in 1856, and squatters occupied some of the land.

Historic sites of the Rancho
Benjamin and Hilarita Lyford House.  The house of Reed's daughter, Hilarita, and her husband Dr. Benjamin F. Lyford, built in 1876 and now located in Tiburon, is listed on the National Register of Historic Places.
Lyford's Stone Tower. Built about 1889 for Dr. Benjamin F. Lyford, retired inventor, physician and scientist, as the gateway to the southern portion of his Utopian tract, "Hygeia, or goddess of Health".
Sawmill. The first sawmill in Marin County, erected by John Reed about 1834, is registered as a California Historical Landmark.

See also
Ranchos of California
List of Ranchos of California

References

 

Corte Madera del Presidio
Corte Madera del Presidio
Corte Madera, California
Mill Valley, California
Tiburon, California
Corte